Emanuele Pecorino (born 15 July 2001) is an Italian professional footballer who plays as a striker for  club Juventus Next Gen.

Club career

Early career 
Pecorino began his youth career at local academy Trinacria aged 6–7, before moving to Catania in 2010. In the 2018–19 season, Pecorino scored 18 goals for the under-19s. In March 2019, AC Milan took him on loan for the Torneo Di Viareggio youth tournament. He scored a goal in the round of 16, in which they were eliminated by Charles De Ketelaere's Club Brugge. He made his first-team debut for Catania on 7 April 2019, coming on in the 55th minute in a 2–1 win against Bisceglie; his 91st-minute header was saved on the goal line, with Andrea Esposito scoring from the rebound.

In summer 2019, Pecorino returned to Milan's youth setup on loan; he scored seven goals in 14 appearances in the Campionato Primavera 2 – nine in 18 in all competitions, helping his side gain promotion to the Campionato Primavera 1. Upon his return to Catania, he was integrated in the first team. His first game in 2020–21 was in the derby against Palermo, playing from the first minute and scoring the equalizer to help his team draw 1–1. Pecorino played the next seven games as a starter, scoring four more goals. Pecorino ended the first half of the season with five goals in 14 appearances (762 minutes).

Juventus 
On 2 February 2021, Pecorino joined Serie C side Juventus U23 – the reserve team of Juventus – on a four-and-a-half-year contract. He made his debut two days later, coming on as a substitute in a 3–0 home defeat against Como. Pecorino's first Juventus U23 goal came on 7 February, as a substitute in a 6–0 home victory against Livorno. On the same day, he started to suffer an osteitis pubis.

Pecorino returned from his injury on 22 August, coming on as a substitute in a 3–2 Coppa Italia Serie C win against Pro Sesto in the 88th minute. Pecorino's first goal in the 2021–22 season came on 20 October, in a 2–2 away draw against AlbinoLeffe. On 14 December, he was operated on for an ostetis pubis again. Pecorino returned from injury on 13 February 2022, as a second-half substitute in a 3–0 win against Mantova. On 13 March, during a 1–0 defeat against Südtirol, Pecorino broke the radius of his right forearm.

On 3 September, Pecorino scored the second goal through a header in Juventus Next Gen's 2–0 victory to Trento on matchday 1.

Style of play 
Pecorino is a left-footed striker known for his strength and holding play. He has good technique, and his height of  helps him in aerial play.

Career statistics

Club

International

References

Notelist

External links 
 
 

2001 births
Living people
Footballers from Sicily
Sportspeople from Catania
Italian footballers
Association football forwards
Catania S.S.D. players
A.C. Milan players
Juventus Next Gen players
Serie C players